The lira (sign: ₺; ISO 4217 code: TRY; abbreviation: TL) is the official currency of Turkey and Northern Cyprus. One lira is divided into one hundred kuruş.

History

Ottoman lira (1844–1923)

The lira, along with the related currencies of Europe and the Middle East, has its roots in the ancient Roman unit of weight known as the libra which referred to the Troy pound of silver. The Roman libra adoption of the currency spread it throughout Europe and the Near East, where it continued to be used into medieval times. The Turkish lira, the French livre (until 1794), the Italian lira (until 2002), Lebanese pound and the pound unit of account in sterling (a translation of the Latin libra; the word "pound" as a unit of weight is still abbreviated as "lb.") are the modern descendants of the ancient currency.

The lira was introduced as the main unit of account in 1844, with the former currency, kuruş, remaining as a  subdivision. The Ottoman lira remained in circulation until the end of 1927.

First Turkish lira (1923–2005) 

The banknotes of the first and second issue depict Mustafa Kemal Atatürk on the obverse side. This change was done according to the 12 January 1926 issue of the official gazette. After Atatürk's death, his portrait was replaced with one of İsmet İnönü for the  third and fourth issues. Atatürk returned for the fifth issue and all subsequent issues.

After periods of the lira pegged to sterling and the franc, a peg of TL 2.8 = US$1 was adopted in 1946 and maintained until 1960, when the currency was devalued to TL 9 = US$1. From 1970, a series of hard, then soft pegs to the dollar operated as the value of the Turkish lira began to fall.

The following are based on yearly averages:
1960s – US$1 = TL 9
1970 – US$1 = TL 11.30
1975 – US$1 = TL 14.40
1980 – US$1 = TL 80
1985 – US$1 = TL 500
1990 – US$1 = TL 2,500
1995 – US$1 = TL 43,000
2000 – US$1 = TL 620,000
2001 – US$1 = TL 1,250,000
2005 – US$1 = TL 1,350,000

The Guinness Book of Records ranked the Turkish lira as the world's least valuable currency in 1995 and 1996, and again from 1999 to 2004. The lira's value had fallen so far that one original gold lira coin could be sold for TL 154,400,000 before the 2005 revaluation.

Second Turkish lira (2005–present) 

In December 2003, the Grand National Assembly of Turkey passed a law that allowed for redenomination by the removal of six zeros from the Turkish lira, and the creation of a new currency. It was introduced on 1 January 2005, replacing the previous Turkish lira (which remained valid in circulation until the end of 2005) at a rate of YTL 1 (ISO 4217 code "TRY") = TL 1,000,000 in old lira (ISO 4217 code "TRL"). With the revaluation of the Turkish lira, the Romanian leu (also revalued in July 2005) briefly became the world's least valued currency unit. At the same time, the Government introduced two new banknotes with the denominations of ₺50 and ₺100.

In the transition period between January 2005 and December 2008, the second Turkish lira was officially called Yeni Türk lirası ("New Turkish lira"). The letter "Y" in the currency code was taken from the Turkish word , meaning new. It was officially abbreviated "YTL" and subdivided into 100 new . Starting in January 2009, the "new" marking was removed from the second Turkish lira, its official name becoming just "Turkish lira" again, abbreviated "TL". All obverse sides of current banknotes have portraits of Mustafa Kemal Atatürk. Until 2016, the same held for the reverse sides of all current coins, but in 2016 ₺1 coins were issued to commemorate the "martyrs and veterans" of the 2016 Turkish coup d'état attempt, the reverse sides of some of which depict hands holding up a Turkish flag while others show in stylized form a collection of five-pointed stars topped by a Turkish flag.

Coins

From 1 January 2009, the prefix "new" was removed from the second Turkish lira, its official name in Turkey becoming "Turkish lira" again; new coins without the word "yeni" were introduced in denominations of 1kr., 5kr., 10kr., 25kr., 50kr. and ₺1. Also, the center and ring alloys of the 50kr. and ₺1 coins were reversed.

Banknotes

A new series of banknotes, the "E-9 Emission Group" entered circulation on 1 January 2009, with the E-8 group ceasing to be valid after 31 December 2009 (although still redeemable at branches of the Central Bank until 31 December 2019). The E-9 banknotes refer to the currency as "Turkish lira" rather than "new Turkish lira" and include a new ₺200 denomination. The new banknotes have different sizes to prevent forgery. The main specificity of this new series is that each denomination depicts a famous Turkish personality, rather than geographical sites and architectural features of Turkey. The dominant color of the 5-Turkish-lira banknote has been determined as "purple" on the second series of the current banknotes.

Currency sign
The lira was originally symbolised as TL, inverting the characters of the Ottoman lira's sign, LT, which stood for "" in French. Historically English language sources used "£T" or "T£" for the currency, but it is unknown whether this notation was ever used within Turkey.

The current currency sign of Turkish lira was created by the Central Bank of the Republic of Turkey in 2012. The new sign was selected after a country-wide contest. The new symbol is composed of the letter L shaped like a half anchor, and embedded double-striped letter T angled at 20 degrees.

The design, created by Tülay Lale, was endorsed after a country-wide competition. It was chosen as the winner from a shortlist of seven submissions to the board of the Central Bank, selected from a total of 8,362 entries. The symbol resembles the first letter of the Turkish monetary unit, L, in the form of a half anchor with double stroke.

Prime Minister Recep Tayyip Erdoğan announced the new symbol on 1 March 2012. At its unveiling, Erdoğan explained the design as "the anchor shape hopes to convey that the currency is a 'safe harbour' while the upward-facing lines represent its rising prestige".

Faik Öztrak, vice chairman of the main opposition party CHP, alleged that the new sign resembles the initials TE of then-prime minister Tayyip Erdoğan in a reference to the tughra of Ottoman sultans. The new Turkish lira sign was also criticized for allegedly showing a similarity with an upside-down Armenian dram sign.

In May 2012, the Unicode Technical Committee accepted the encoding of a new character  for the currency sign, which was included in Unicode 6.2 released in September 2012. On Microsoft Windows operating systems, when using Turkish-Q or Turkish-F keyboard layouts, it can be typed with the combination .

2018–present currency crisis 
In 2018, the lira's exchange rate accelerated deterioration, reaching a level of ₺4.5/US$ by mid-May and of ₺4.9 a week later. Among economists, the accelerating loss of value was generally attributed to Recep Tayyip Erdoğan preventing the Central Bank of the Republic of Turkey from making the necessary interest rate adjustments. Erdoğan, who claimed interest rates beyond his control to be "the mother and father of all evil", said that "the central bank can't take this independence and set aside the signals given by the president." Despite Erdogan's apparent opposition, Turkey's Central Bank raised interest rates sharply.

As of 2020, the Turkish lira continued to plummet in value, with the currency going through a process of depreciation, consistently reaching all-time lows. The Turkish lira deflated by over 400% compared to the US dollar and the euro since 2008, largely due to Erdoğan's expansionist foreign policy. Erdoğan has tried to fix the current financial crisis with unorthodox methods of banking.

The Turkish lira recovered partially throughout early 2021 with the government's rise of interest rates, until the currency began crashing though rapid stages of inflation and depreciation on 21 March 2021, after the sacking of Central Bank chief Naci Ağbal. The Turkish lira on 4 June reached a then-all-time-low of ₺8.8 to the dollar. The Turkish lira being one of the quickest collapsing currencies in 2021. The Turkish lira during September 2021 reached a new low of ₺8.9 to the dollar. In late 2021 the Turkish lira began collapsing rapidly, with the exchange rate falling 9% against the US dollar, reaching an all-time low of ₺12.5 to the dollar. The Turkish lira continued to collapse in December, with the inflation rate reaching unseen levels, the Turkish lira collapsing to ₺14.5 to the US Dollar, losing nearly all of its original value. On December 17, the lira fell by 8.5%, raising the exchange rate to ₺16.5 to the US dollar. Despite the currency collapse, Erdoğan lowered interest rates down to 14% from 15%, with the lira losing half of its value since the start of 2021. The Turkish Lira continued to lower throughout 2022. The central bank governor Şahap Kavcıoğlu lowered interest rates by 150 basis points, from 12% to 10.5%, down from 2021 low of 15%. The official inflation rate of the Lira through 2022 reached 83%. Independent reviews of the Turkish lira put the inflation rate higher.

Politics and perceptions

In the campaign for the 2018 general election in Turkey, a widespread conspiracy theory claimed that the Turkish lira's decline was the work of a shadowy group, made up of "Americans, English, Dutch and some Jewish families" who would want to deprive incumbent President Erdoğan of support in the elections. According to a poll from April 2018, 42 percent of Turks and 59 percent of governing AK Party voters saw the decline in the lira as a plot by foreign powers.
Turkish foreign minister Mevlüt Çavuşoğlu claimed Trump's wish to let the current US-Turkish tensions to drag on to the November 2018 US elections so to appeal to his Christian base and gain some points for his party.

The late 2021 collapse of the Turkish lira has cost Erdoğan greatly, for with the currency collapsing faster than it ever had in its history, his opinion poll ratings are slumping. He recently sacked another finance minister and replaced him with a hard-line Erdoğanist and opponent of interest rates. In a statement on 10 December 2021, the Central Bank said it had sold foreign exchange for a third time during December 2021, helping to arrest the lira's slide closer to the 14-per-dollar mark. The loss of value by the Turkish lira has had a large effect on the prices of goods in Turkey, the price of bread since December 2021, according to the BBC, rising 40%. The collapse has also drastically increased the cost of imports.

Current exchange rates

See also 

 Banknotes of Turkey
 Coins of Turkey
 Economy of Turkey
 Economy of Northern Cyprus
 Ottoman lira

References

Further reading

External links 
 
 Turkish Central Bank (Banknote Museum page)
 TL Simge Turkish lira sign page of the Central Bank of the Republic of Turkey website
 Detailed information on the Turkish lira banknotes and coins in circulation since 2009
 Turk Numismatics
 Turkish Lira Today
 Turkey Banknotes Catalog | Turkish Lira since 1923
 Historical and current banknotes of Turkey 

Lira
History of the Republic of Turkey
Economy of Northern Cyprus
Banknotes of Turkey
Economy of the Ottoman Empire
Currency symbols